Lullingstone Castle is a historic manor house, set in an estate in the village of Lullingstone and the civil parish of Eynsford in the English county of Kent. It has been inhabited by members of the Hart Dyke family for twenty generations including current owner Tom Hart Dyke.

History
Mentioned in the Domesday Book, the manor of Lullingstone was acquired in 1279 by Gregory de Rokesley, who served eight terms as Lord Mayor of London. It passed down in the Rokesley family for several generations before being sold to the Peche family. The present manor house was started in 1497 by Sir John Peche, High Sheriff of Kent for 1494-95 and later (1509) joint Lord Deputy of Calais. Henry VIII and Queen Anne were regular visitors to the house.

In 1543 the estate passed by marriage to his nephew, Sir Percyval Hart, chief steward and knight harbinger to King Henry VIII, King Edward VI, Queen Mary I, and Queen Elizabeth I. He died in 1580 and the estate passed to his grandson, Sir Percival Hart. In May 1603 he sent fish and poultry from the Lullingstone estate to King James at Theobalds. The house passed to his great-grandson, yet another Percival Hart, who was High Sheriff of Kent in 1706, who remodelled the house and renamed it Lullingstone Castle. He left one daughter, Anne, who in turn married John Bluet and Sir Thomas Dyke.

In 1934 the estate was sold to Kemp Town Brewery, who resold it to Kent County Council in 1938. It was occupied by the Army during World War II. In the mid-1960s Dartford Rural District council laid out a golf course in the grounds and created a public park. The house itself remains in the hands of the Hart Dyke family.

In 2011, the Castle was the location for the Comparethemarket.com advert 'Tough decision', featuring meerkats Sergei and Aleksandr.

The house
The house, now known as Lullingstone Castle (though it in no way resembles a castle) is a Grade II* listed building which is built in red brick in three storeys. Traces of the original 16th-century building can be seen in the north and east fronts, between which is the remodelled two-storey entrance front.

The gatehouse
The gatehouse was constructed in the late 16th century. Built by Sir John Peche, it is believed to be one of the first in England built entirely of brick. Only the outer gatehouse remains - the inner gatehouse was demolished in the 18th century. It is a Grade I listed building.

The gardens
The surrounding  park was previously a fenced deer park, with the castle serving as a hunting lodge.  The grounds are located on the River Darent and hidden within it are Queen Anne's bathhouse and  an icehouse dating from the 18th century. Most of the grounds of the former estate now constitute Lullingstone Country Park and are Grade II listed.

The park contains some of the oldest oak trees in Britain, wildflowers, a church (St Botolph's) of Norman and possibly earlier foundation but much later restoration and rebuilding, and a walled garden, and at one time  Lullingstone Roman Villa.

Zoe Dyke created the Lullingstone Silk Farm here which was visited by Queen Mary and as a result it created silk for the coronation robe of King George VI. The farm has since moved away but has produced silk for other important Royal events including the Wedding dress of Princess Elizabeth and the Wedding dress of Lady Diana Spencer.

The walled garden, previously a herb garden designed by Eleanour Sinclair Rohde, has recently been converted into the World Garden of Plants by the Castle's current owner (and 20th generation of the Hart Dykes), plant hunter Tom Hart Dyke.  That conversion was the subject of the BBC2 series Save Lullingstone Castle. Tom Hart Dyke and the World Garden were again featured in Spring 2007 on the BBC2 series, Return to Lullingstone Castle. The garden and the castle are open to the public from April through to September.

Gallery

Notes

External links

 

Country houses in Kent
Gardens in Kent
Buildings and structures in Sevenoaks District
Grade II* listed buildings in Kent
Historic house museums in Kent